The  is the highest-ranking military officer and head of the Operational Authority (command) over the Japan Self-Defense Forces (JSDF). The Chief of Staff, Joint Staff assists the Minister of Defense on all matters of the JSDF, and executes orders of the Minister of Defense with directions from the Prime Minister.

The current Chief of Staff, Joint Staff is General Kōji Yamazaki.

Structure

The Chief of Staff, Joint Staff supervises the service branches operations of the Japan Self-Defense Forces, and would assume command in the event of a war, but their powers are limited to policy formation and defense coordination during peacetime. The chain of operational authority runs from the Chief of Staff, Joint Staff to the commanders of the several Operational Commands.

Each service branch is headed by its respective chief of staff, who has administrative control over its own services.

List of officeholders

Chairman of the Joint Staff Council

Chief of Staff, Joint Staff

See also 

Minister of Defense (Japan)

References 

Japan
Japan Self-Defense Forces
Military units and formations established in 1954